Blaulicht (Blue Light) is an East German crime television drama series, whose 29 episodes were based on  crime case files.

German crime television series
1950s German television series
1959 German television series debuts
1968 German television series endings
German-language television shows
Television in East Germany
1950s German police procedural television series
1960s German police procedural television series